The 2016–17 Los Angeles Lakers season was the franchise's 69th season, its 68th season in the National Basketball Association (NBA), and its 57th in Los Angeles. It was also the first season without Kobe Bryant since the 1995–96 season as he retired from the NBA in April 2016. It would also be the season where after multiple opportunities to improve upon themselves came and went, the Lakers decided to replace Jim Buss and Mitch Kupchak with former Lakers legend Magic Johnson and former sports agent Rob Pelinka on February 21, 2017, as both president of basketball operations and general manager respectively. Furthermore, it was the season where Jeanie Buss would officially be named the primary owner of the Lakers on March 27.

On the anniversary of Kobe Bryant's legendary 81–point game on January 22, 2017, the Lakers lost by 49 points to the Dallas Mavericks 122–73 at the American Airlines Center marking the Los Angeles Lakers' suffered their worst loss ever in franchise history surpassing their record set when the Utah Jazz won by 48 points 123–75 over the Lakers in Bryant's final game played in Salt Lake City in Utah on March 28, 2016.

Despite not making it to the playoffs, the Lakers managed to improve nine wins with an 26–56 record on their franchise worst 17–65 record from the year before.

Following the season, D'Angelo Russell was traded to the Brooklyn Nets, Nick Young signed with the Golden State Warriors, and Metta World Peace retired.

Draft

Roster

Standings

Division

Conference

Game log

Preseason

|- style="background:#bfb;"
| 1
| October 4
| Sacramento
| 
| Tarik Black (15)
| Timofey Mozgov (9)
| José Calderón (3)
| Honda Center (Anaheim)9,187
| 1–0
|- style="background:#fcc;"
| 2
| October 7
| Denver
| 
| D'Angelo Russell (21)
| Julius Randle (6)
| D'Angelo Russell (5)
| Staples Center16,461
| 1–1
|- style="background:#bfb;"
| 3
| October 9
| Denver
| 
| D'Angelo Russell (33)
| Tarik Black (5)
| Julius Randle (5)
| Citizens Business Bank Arena (Ontario)8,389
| 2–1
|- style="background:#fcc;"
| 4
| October 11
| Portland
| 
| Jordan Clarkson (15)
| Julius Randle (13)
| Marcelo Huertas (5)
| Staples Center15,290
| 2–2
|- style= "background:#fcc;"
| 5
| October 13
| Sacramento
| 
| D'Angelo Russell (31)
| Julius Randle (10)
| D'Angelo Russell (11)
| T-Mobile Arena (Las Vegas) 8,905
| 2–3
|- style="background:#fcc;"
| 6
| October 15
| Golden State
| 
| Nick Young (17)
| Julius Randle (7)
| D'Angelo Russell (5)
| T-Mobile Arena (Las Vegas)13,669
| 2–4
|- style="background:#fcc;"
| 7
| October 19
| Golden State
| 
| Brandon Ingram (21)
| Brandon Ingram (7)
| D'Angelo Russell (9)
| Valley View Casino Center (San Diego) 15,821
| 2–5
|- style= "background:#fcc;"
| 8
| October 21
| Phoenix
| 
| D'Angelo Russell (17)
| Julius Randle (8)
| D'Angelo Russell (6)
| Honda Center13,489
| 2–6

Regular season

|- style="background:#cfc;"
| 1
| October 26
| Houston
| 
| Jordan Clarkson (25)
| Timofey Mozgov (8)
| Julius Randle (6)
| Staples Center18,997
| 1–0
|- style="background:#fcc;"
| 2
| October 28
| @ Utah
| 
| Lou Williams (17)
| Luol Deng (12)
| Lou Williams (6)
| Vivint Smart Home Arena19,911
| 1–1
|- style="background:#fcc;"
| 3
| October 30
| @ Oklahoma City
| 
| Randle, Russell (20)
| Julius Randle (9)
| D'Angelo Russell (5)
| Chesapeake Energy Arena18,203
| 1–2

|- style="background:#fcc"
| 4
| November 1
| @ Indiana
| 
| Lou Williams (19)
| Julius Randle (10)
| Lou Williams (5)
| Bankers Life Fieldhouse17,923
| 1–3
|- style="background:#cfc;"
| 5
| November 2
| @ Atlanta
| 
| D'Angelo Russell (23)
| Luol Deng (10)
| D'Angelo Russell (8)
| Philips Arena13,800
| 2–3
|- style="background:#cfc;"
| 6
| November 4
| Golden State
| 
| Julius Randle (20)
| Julius Randle (14)
| Jordan Clarkson (5)
| Staples Center18,997
| 3−3
|- style="background:#cfc;"
| 7
| November 6
| Phoenix
| 
| Nick Young (22)
| Timofey Mozgov (8)
| Russell, Williams (6)
| Staples Center18,997
| 4−3
|- style="background:#fcc;"
| 8
| November 8
| Dallas
| 
| Jordan Clarkson (22)
| Julius Randle (10)
| D'Angelo Russell (7)
| Staples Center18,997
| 4−4
|- style="background:#cfc;"
| 9
| November 10
| @ Sacramento
| 
| Lou Williams (21)
| Julius Randle (8)
| Clarkson, Randle (5)
| Golden 1 Center17,608
| 5−4
|- style="background:#cfc;"
| 10
| November 12
| @ New Orleans
| 
| Jordan Clarkson (23)
| Julius Randle (11)
| Julius Randle (8)
| Smoothie King Center17,138
| 6−4
|- style="background:#fcc;"
| 11
| November 13
| @ Minnesota
| 
| Lou Williams (17)
| Julius Randle (6)
| Williams, Russell (4)
| Target Center14,432
| 6−5
|- style="background:#cfc;"
| 12
| November 15
| Brooklyn
| 
| D'Angelo Russell (32)
| Julius Randle (14)
| Julius Randle (10)
| Staples Center18,426
| 7−5
|- style="background:#fcc;"
| 13
| November 18
| San Antonio
| 
| Lou Williams (24)
| Julius Randle (9)
| Julius Randle (7)
| Staples Center18,997
| 7−6
|- style="background:#fcc;"
| 14
| November 20
| Chicago
| 
| Lou Williams (25)
| Young, Nance Jr., Black (6)
| D'Angelo Russell (7)
| Staples Center18,997
| 7−7
|- style="background:#cfc;"
| 15
| November 22
| Oklahoma City
| 
| Jordan Clarkson (18)
| Calderón, Black (6)
| Lou Williams (5)
| Staples Center18,997
| 8−7
|- style="background:#fcc;"
| 16
| November 23
| @ Golden State
| 
| Clarkson, Williams, Ingram (16)
| Nance Jr., Deng (7)
| José Calderón (7)
| Oracle Arena19,596
| 8−8
|- style="background:#fcc;"
| 17
| November 25
| Golden State
| 
| Jordan Clarkson (20)
| Thomas Robinson (10)
| José Calderón (6)
| Staples Center18,997
| 8−9
|- style="background:#cfc;"
| 18
| November 27
| Atlanta
| 
| Lou Williams (21)
| Larry Nance Jr. (10)
| Jordan Clarkson (5)
| Staples Center18,997
| 9−9
|- style="background:#fcc;"
| 19
| November 29
| @ New Orleans
| 
| Lou Williams (16)
| Julius Randle (10)
| José Calderón (6)
| Smoothie King Center14,024
| 9−10
|- style="background:#cfc;"
| 20
| November 30
| @ Chicago
| 
| Clarkson, Williams (18)
| Julius Randle (20)
| Lou Williams (5)
| United Center21,773
| 10–10

|- style="background:#fcc;"
| 21
| December 2
| @ Toronto
| 
| Brandon Ingram (17)
| Julius Randle (8)
| Lou Williams (4)
| Air Canada Centre19,800
| 10–11
|- style="background:#fcc;"
| 22
| December 3
| @ Memphis
| 
| Lou Williams (40)
| Randle, Black (6)
| Marcelo Huertas (7)
| FedExForum17,017
| 10–12
|- style="background:#fcc;"
| 23
| December 5
| Utah
| 
| Lou Williams (38)
| Julius Randle (11)
| Lou Williams (7)
| Staples Center18,279
| 10–13
|- style="background:#fcc;"
| 24
| December 7
| @ Houston
| 
| Lou Williams (24)
| Julius Randle (10)
| Marcelo Huertas (7)
| Toyota Center16,141
| 10–14
|- style="background:#fcc;"
| 25
| December 9
| Phoenix
| 
| Lou Williams (35)
| Luol Deng (11)
| Julius Randle (5)
| Staples Center18,997
| 10–15
|- style="background:#fcc;"
| 26
| December 11
| New York
| 
| Lou Williams (24)
| Julius Randle (10)
| Russell, Williams (5)
| Staples Center18,997
| 10–16
|- style="background:#fcc;"
| 27
| December 12
| @ Sacramento
| 
| D'Angelo Russell (17)
| Julius Randle (8)
| Russell, Deng (4)
| Golden 1 Center17,608
| 10–17
|- style="background:#fcc;"
| 28
| December 14
| @ Brooklyn
| 
| Lou Williams (16)
| Timofey Mozgov (13)
| Nance Jr., Russell, Deng, Williams (2)
| Barclays Center17,732
| 10–18
|- style="background:#cfc;"
| 29
| December 16
| @ Philadelphia
| 
| Julius Randle (25)
| Julius Randle (9)
| Deng, Williams (3)
| Wells Fargo Center20,491
| 11–18
|- style="background:#fcc;"
| 30
| December 17
| @ Cleveland
| 
| Nick Young (32)
| Brandon Ingram (10)
| Brandon Ingram (9)
| Quicken Loans Arena20,562
| 11–19
|- style="background:#fcc;"
| 31
| December 20
| @ Charlotte
| 
| Jordan Clarkson (25)
| Luol Deng (7)
| Lou Williams (8)
| Spectrum Center19,093
| 11–20
|- style="background:#fcc;"
| 32
| December 22
| @ Miami
| 
| Lou Williams (27)
| Thomas Robinson (12)
| D'Angelo Russell (7)
| American Airlines Arena19,712
| 11–21
|- style="background:#fcc;"
| 33
| December 23
| @ Orlando
| 
| Jordan Clarkson (18)
| Thomas Robinson (11)
| Huertas, Deng, Russell (3)
| Amway Center18,846
| 11–22
|- style="background:#cfc;"
| 34
| December 25
| LA Clippers
| 
| Mozgov, Young (19)
| Luol Deng (12)
| Julius Randle (8)
| Staples Center18,997
| 12–22
|- style="background:#fcc;"
| 35
| December 27
| Utah
| 
| Julius Randle (25)
| Julius Randle (12)
| D'Angelo Russell (4)
| Staples Center18,997
| 12–23
|- style="background:#fcc;"
| 36
| December 29
| Dallas
| 
| Julius Randle (18)
| Thomas Robinson (10)
| D'Angelo Russell (6)
| Staples Center18,997
| 12–24

|- style="background:#fcc;"
| 37
| January 1
| Toronto
| 
| D'Angelo Russell (28)
| Black, Randle, Robinson  (9)
| Julius Randle (6)
| Staples Center18,997
| 12–25
|- style="background:#cfc;"
| 38
| January 3
| Memphis
| 
| Nick Young (20)
| Julius Randle (14)
| Julius Randle (11)
| Staples Center18,997
| 13–25
|- style="background:#fcc;"
| 39
| January 5
| @ Portland
| 
| D'Angelo Russell (22)
| Julius Randle (9)
| Julius Randle (5)
| Moda Center19,403
| 13–26
|- style="background:#cfc;"
| 40
| January 6
| Miami
| 
| Lou Williams (24)
| Luol Deng (14)
| D'Angelo Russell (5)
| Staples Center18,997
| 14–26
|- style="background:#cfc;"
| 41
| January 8
| Orlando
| 
| Julius Randle (19)
| Randle, Mozgov (9)
| D'Angelo Russell (7)
| Staples Center18,997
| 15–26
|- style="background:#fcc"
| 42
| January 10
| Portland
| 
| Luol Deng (14)
| Julius Randle (10)
| D'Angelo Russell (6)
| Staples Center18,483
| 15–27
|- style="background:#fcc"
| 43
| January 12
| @ San Antonio
| 
| Julius Randle (22)
| Julius Randle (6)
| Julius Randle (5)
| AT&T Center18,418
| 15–28
|- style="background:#fcc"
| 44
| January 14
| @ LA Clippers
| 
| Jordan Clarkson (21)
| Julius Randle (8)
| Russell, Ingram (5)
| Staples Center19,060
| 15–29
|- style="background:#fcc"
| 45
| January 15
| Detroit
| 
| Lou Williams (26)
| Julius Randle (10)
| Williams, Randle (4)
| Staples Center18,997
| 15–30
|- style="background:#fcc"
| 46
| January 17
| Denver
| 
| Lou Williams (24)
| Ivica Zubac (13)
| Julius Randle, Lou Williams (7)
| Staples Center18,412
| 15–31
|- style=background:#cfc;"
| 47
| January 20
| Indiana
| 
| Lou Williams (27)
| Tarik Black (13)
| José Calderón (6)
| Staples Center18,412
| 16–31
|- style=background:#fcc;"
| 48
| January 22
| @ Dallas
| 
| Lou Williams (15)
| Timofey Mozgov (8)
| Julius Randle (4)
| American Airlines Center19,484
| 16–32
|- style=background:#fcc;"
| 49
| January 25
| @ Portland
| 
| Lou Williams (31)
| Ivica Zubac (10)
| Lou Williams (5)
| Moda Center19,393
| 16–33
|- style=background:#fcc;"
| 50
| January 26
| @ Utah
| 
| Lou Williams (20)
| Ivica Zubac (10)
| Jordan Clarkson (4)
| Vivint Smart Home Arena19,911
| 16–34
|- style=background:#cfc;"
| 51
| January 31
| Denver
| 
| Nick Young (23)
| Tarik Black (8)
| D'Angelo Russell (10)
| Staples Center18,997
| 17–34

|- style=background:#fcc;"
| 52
| February 2
| @ Washington
| 
| Jordan Clarkson (20)
| Tarik Black (11)
| D'Angelo Russell (11)
| Verizon Center16,473
| 17–35
|- style=background:#fcc;"
| 53
| February 3
| @ Boston
| 
| Lou Williams (21)
| Larry Nance Jr. (11)
| D'Angelo Russell (6)
| TD Garden18,624
| 17–36
|- style=background:#cfc;"
| 54
| February 6
| @ New York
| 
| Lou Williams (22)
| Larry Nance Jr. (10)
| D'Angelo Russell (6)
| Madison Square Garden19,812
| 18–36
|- style=background:#fcc;"
| 55
| February 8
| @ Detroit
| 
| Randle, Williams (17)
| Tarik Black (10)
| Russell, Ingram (5)
| The Palace of Auburn Hills15,121
| 18–37
|- style=background:#cfc;"
| 56
| February 10
| @ Milwaukee
| 
| Nick Young (26)
| Julius Randle (7)
| D'Angelo Russell (6)
| BMO Harris Bradley Center16,380
| 19–37
|- style=background:#fcc;"
| 57
| February 14
| Sacramento
| 
| Lou Williams (29)
| Randle, Clarkson (7)
| Lou Williams (5)
| Staples Center18,997
| 19–38
|- style=background:#fcc;"
| 58
| February 15
| @ Phoenix
| 
| Russell, Williams (21)
| Julius Randle (10)
| Larry Nance Jr. (5)
| Talking Stick Resort Arena18,055
| 19–39
|- style=background:#fcc;"
| 59
| February 24
| @ Oklahoma City
| 
| D'Angelo Russell (29)
| Julius Randle (11)
| D'Angelo Russell (6)
| Chesapeake Energy Arena18,203
| 19–40
|- style=background:#fcc;"
| 60
| February 26
| San Antonio
| 
| Brandon Ingram (22)
| Julius Randle (12)
| Julius Randle (4)
| Staples Center18,997
| 19–41
|- style=background:#fcc;"
| 61
| February 28
| Charlotte
| 
| Russell, Randle (23)
| Julius Randle (18)
| D'Angelo Russell (9)
| Staples Center18,997
| 19–42

|- style=background:#fcc;"
| 62
| March 3
| Boston
| 
| Jordan Clarkson (20)
| Julius Randle (7)
| Russell, Nance Jr. (4)
| Staples Center18,997
| 19–43
|- style=background:#fcc;"
| 63
| March 5
| New Orleans
| 
| Nick Young (19)
| Julius Randle (12)
| D'Angelo Russell (7)
| Staples Center18,997
| 19–44
|- style=background:#fcc;"
| 64
| March 7
| @ Dallas
| 
| Russell, Clarkson (22)
| Julius Randle (18)
| Julius Randle (10)
| American Airlines Center20,484
| 19–45
|- style=background:#cfc;"
| 65
| March 9
| @ Phoenix
| 
| D'Angelo Russell (28)
| Randle, Nance Jr. (8)
| Randle, Brewer (4)
| Talking Stick Resort Arena17,552
| 20–45
|- style=background:#fcc;"
| 66
| March 12
| Philadelphia
| 
| Jordan Clarkson (30)
| Julius Randle (12)
| D'Angelo Russell (7)
| Staples Center18,997
| 20–46
|- style=background:#fcc;"
| 67
| March 13
| @ Denver
| 
| Ivica Zubac (25)
| Ivica Zubac (11)
| Russell, Clarkson (3)
| Pepsi Center17,344
| 20–47
|- style=background:#fcc;"
| 68
| March 15
| @ Houston
| 
| Julius Randle (32)
| Julius Randle (8)
| Ingram, Clarkson (3)
| Toyota Center18,055
| 20–48
|- style=background:#fcc;"
| 69
| March 17
| Milwaukee
| 
| Jordan Clarkson (21)
| Julius Randle (12)
| Julius Randle (8)
| Staples Center18,997
| 20–49
|- style=background:#fcc;"
| 70
| March 19
| Cleveland
| 
| D'Angelo Russell (40)
| Corey Brewer (9)
| Julius Randle (7)
| Staples Center18,997
| 20–50
|- style=background:#fcc;"
| 71
| March 21
| LA Clippers
| 
| Brandon Ingram (21)
| Randle, Zubac (7)
| Russell, Clarkson (5)
| Staples Center18,724
| 20–51
|- style=background:#cfc;"
| 72
| March 24
| Minnesota
| 
| Jordan Clarkson (35)
| Julius Randle (12)
| D'Angelo Russell (6)
| Staples Center18,997
| 21–51
|- style=background:#fcc;"
| 73
| March 26
| Portland
| 
| D'Angelo Russell (22)
| Julius Randle (9)
| Jordan Clarkson (6)
| Staples Center18,698
| 21–52
|- style=background:#fcc;"
| 74
| March 28
| Washington
| 
| D'Angelo Russell (28)
| Larry Nance Jr. (10)
| D'Angelo Russell (9)
| Staples Center18,997
| 21–53
|- style=background:#fcc;"
| 75
| March 30
| @ Minnesota
| 
| Jordan Clarkson (18)
| Julius Randle (13)
| Jordan Clarkson (7)
| Target Center18,179
| 21–54

|- style=background:#fcc;"
| 76
| April 1
| @ LA Clippers
| 
| David Nwaba (19)
| Thomas Robinson (9)
| D'Angelo Russell (6)
| Staples Center19,060
| 21–55
|- style=background:#cfc;"
| 77
| April 2
| Memphis
| 
| D'Angelo Russell (28)
| Larry Nance Jr. (14)
| D'Angelo Russell (5)
| Staples Center18,997
| 22–55
|- style=background:#cfc;"
| 78
| April 5
| @ San Antonio
| 
| Tyler Ennis (19)
| Larry Nance Jr. (9)
| Tyler Ennis (6)
| AT&T Center18,418
| 23–55
|- style=background:#cfc;"
| 79
| April 7
| Sacramento
| 
| Julius Randle (25)
| Larry Nance Jr. (11)
| Jordan Clarkson (6)
| Staples Center18,997
| 24–55
|- style=background:#cfc;"
| 80
| April 9
| Minnesota
| 
| Tyler Ennis (20)
| Larry Nance Jr. (10)
| Larry Nance Jr. (6)
| Staples Center18,997
| 25–55
|- style=background:#cfc;"
| 81
| April 11
| New Orleans
| 
| Metta World Peace (18)
| Tarik Black (9)
| Brandon Ingram (6)
| Staples Center18,997
| 26–55
|- style=background:#fcc;"
| 82
| April 12
| @ Golden State
| 
| Jordan Clarkson (17)
| Larry Nance Jr. (11)
| Ingram, Ennis (5)
| Oracle Arena19,596
| 26–56

Transactions

Trades

Free agency

Re-signed

Additions

Subtractions

References

2016-17
2016–17 NBA season by team
2016 in sports in California
2017 in sports in California
2016 in Los Angeles
2017 in Los Angeles